Lansing is a city in Lansing Township, Allamakee County, Iowa, United States. The population was 968 at the time of the 2020 census.

History

Lansing was platted circa 1851. The city was so named because the first settler was a native of Lansing, Michigan.

Joseph "Diamond Jo" Reynolds, namesake of the famous Diamond Jo steamship line, built his first boat in Lansing and named it for the town.

Geography

Mount Hosmer is located on the north end of Lansing.

Demographics

2010 census
As of the census of 2010, there were 999 people, 451 households, and 257 families living in the city. The racial makeup of the city was 98.8% White, 0.1% African American, 0.2% Native American, 0.4% Asian, 0.4% from other races, and 0.1% from two or more races. Hispanic or Latino of any race were 0.6% of the population.

There were 451 households, of which 22.6% had children under the age of 18 living with them, 45.5% were married couples living together, 7.5% had a female householder with no husband present, 4.0% had a male householder with no wife present, and 43.0% were non-families. 37.5% of all households were made up of individuals, and 16.4% had someone living alone who was 65 years of age or older. The average household size was 2.10 and the average family size was 2.74.

The median age in the city was 50.9 years. 17.9% of residents were under the age of 18; 5.8% were between the ages of 18 and 24; 18.4% were from 25 to 44; 30.8% were from 45 to 64; and 27% were 65 years of age or older. The gender makeup of the city was 49.5% male and 50.5% female.

2000 census
As of the census of 2000, there were 1,012 people, 441 households, and 258 families living in the city. The racial makeup of the city was 99.01% White, 0.10% African American, 0.40% Asian, 0.49% from other races. Hispanic or Latino of any race were 0.59% of the population.

There were 441 households, out of which 22.9% had children under the age of 18 living with them, 48.1% were married couples living together, 7.9% had a female householder with no husband present, and 41.3% were non-families. 37.4% of all households were made up of individuals, and 19.5% had someone living alone who was 65 years of age or older.  The average household size was 2.17 and the average family size was 2.87.

Age spread: 20.7% under the age of 18, 5.6% from 18 to 24, 21.9% from 25 to 44, 24.5% from 45 to 64, and 27.3% who were 65 years of age or older.  The median age was 46 years. For every 100 females, there were 87.4 males.  For every 100 females age 18 and over, there were 86.7 males.

The median income for a household in the city was $29,482, and the median income for a family was $34,519. Males had a median income of $26,510 versus $17,596 for females. The per capita income for the city was $17,372.  About 4.2% of families and 6.8% of the population were below the poverty line, including 1.7% of those under age 18 and 12.4% of those age 65 or over.

Transportation

Lansing is served by Iowa Highway 9, which terminates on the Black Hawk Bridge leading to Wisconsin. Beginning in 2017, the Iowa Department of Transportation revealed plans to replace the Black Hawk Bridge with construction beginning in 2024.

Mississippi River
Lansing is a river town, right on the main channel of the Mississippi River, and consequently has a resort-like feel from the seasonal recreational boaters.

Education
The Eastern Allamakee Community School District operates local public schools.
 New Albin Elementary School
 Lansing Middle School
 Kee High School

News media
The Waukon Standard is the local newspaper.

Attractions
 Old Stone School – Built in 1864
 Commercial Fishing Museum – Displays Lansing's history as a fishing town including commercial fishing, the pearl button industry, and ice harvesting.
 Blackhawk Bridge – Built in 1931
 Mount Hosmer – Named after artist Harriet Hosmer after she climbed to the peak on a visit in 1851. Visitors can drive to the top where they can enjoy beautiful views of the Mississippi River and three states (Iowa, Minnesota, Wisconsin)
 Mississippi Explorer – Enjoy a scenic guided boat ride on the Mississippi River
 Allamakee County Historical Society Museum
 Fish Farm Mounds
 Lansing Fish Days
 Village Creek Bible Camp
 Driftless Area Education and Visitor Center

Notable people
 James Isham Gilbert - Union general during Civil War; settled in Iowa in 1851 where he helped found the town of Lansing.
 Edwin G. Krebs - co-recipient of 1992 Nobel Prize in Medicine.

References

External links
 City Website

 
Cities in Allamakee County, Iowa
Cities in Iowa
Iowa populated places on the Mississippi River
1851 establishments in Iowa
Populated places established in 1851